Andrey Mikhailovich Golovatiuk (also transliterated as Andrei Golovatuk), born December 17, 1968, is a member for the LDPR of the State Duma of Russia. He has attended a university of military engineering. He is a member of the Duma committee of defense. He was formerly a commander of a Ministry of Internal Affairs Special Forces division.

References 

1968 births
Living people
Fourth convocation members of the State Duma (Russian Federation)
Liberal Democratic Party of Russia politicians